Saint Mo Chutu mac Fínaill (died 14 May 639), also known as Mochuda, Carthach or Carthach the Younger (a name Latinized as Carthagus and Anglicized as Carthage ), was abbot of Rahan, County Offaly and subsequently, founder and first abbot of Lismore (Irish Les Mór Mo Chutu), County Waterford. The saint's Life has come down in several Irish and Latin recensions, which appear to derive from a Latin original written in the 11th or 12th century.

Life
Through his father, Fínall Fíngein, Mo Chutu belonged to the Ciarraige Luachra, while his mother, Finmed, was of the Corco Duibne. Notes added to the Félire Óengusso (the Martyrology of Óengus) claim that his foster father was Carthach mac Fianáin, that is Carthach the Elder, whose period of activity can be assigned to the late 6th century.

Mo Chutu first became abbot of Rahan, a monastery which lay in the territory of the southern Uí Néill. He composed a rule for his monks, an Irish metrical poem of 580 lines, divided into nine separate sections, a notable literary relic of the early Irish Church.

According to the Annals of Ulster, he was expelled from the monastery during the Easter season of 637. The incident has been connected with the Easter controversy, in which Irish churches were involved during the 7th century. Through his training in Munster, Mo Chutu may have been a supporter of the Roman system of calculation, which would have brought him into conflict with adherents of the 'Celtic' reckoning in Leinster.

Following his expulsion, Mo Chutu journeyed to the Déisi, where he founded the great monastery of Lismore (in modern County Waterford). The Latin and Irish Lives make very little of Mo Chutu's earlier misfortune and focus instead on the saint's resistance to the oppressive Uí Néill rulers and his joyous reception among the Déisi. He has been portrayed in a heroic light in Indarba Mo Chutu a r-Raithin (The expulsion of Mo Chutu from Rahan).

His foundation at Lismore flourished after his lifetime, eclipsing the reputation of the saint's earlier church. It was able to withstand the Viking depredations which plagued the area and benefited from the generosity of Munster kings, notably the Mac Carthaig of Desmond. In the 12th century, St Déclán's foundation of Ardmore aspired to the status of episcopal see in the new diocese, but the privilege went instead to Lismore.

His feast day in the Irish martyrologies is 14 May, as well as in the Great Synaxaristes of the Eastern Orthodox Church. 

In the present calendar of the Catholic Church in Ireland, in which 14 May is the feast of Saint Matthias, the memorial of Saint Carthage is celebrated on 15 May.

Notes

Sources

Johnston, Elva. "Munster, saints of (act. c. 450 – c. 700)." Oxford Dictionary of National Biography. Oxford University Press, September 2004, online edition May 2008; retrieved 14 December 2008.

External links

 Lives of SS Declan and Mochuda, Gutenberg.org

639 deaths
7th-century Christian saints
7th-century Irish bishops
7th-century Irish abbots
People from County Offaly
People from County Waterford
Medieval saints of Munster
Medieval saints of Meath